Sardar Udham is a 2021 Indian Hindi-language biographical historical drama film directed by Shoojit Sircar, and produced by Rising Sun Films in collaboration with Kino Works. The screenplay is written by Shubhendu Bhattacharya and Ritesh Shah, with Bhattacharya also writing the story based on team research, and Shah also writing the dialogues, while playing a supporting role. Based on the life of Udham Singh, a freedom fighter from Punjab who assassinated Michael O'Dwyer in London to avenge the 1919 Jallianwala Bagh massacre in Amritsar, the film starred Vicky Kaushal in the titular role, along with Shaun Scott, Stephen Hogan, Amol Parashar, Banita Sandhu and Kirsty Averton in supporting roles.

The film was officially announced in March 2019, with principal photography began on April. In a marathon schedule of 7 months, the makers completed the shooting of the film in December 2019. Set in India and England, principal photography took place in Russia and India, with few sequences in United Kingdom and Ireland. Sardar Udham features musical score composed by Shantanu Moitra, cinematography handled by Avik Mukhopadhyay and editing done by Chandrashekhar Prajapati.

Initially being delayed multiple times due to the COVID-19 pandemic lockdown, the makers headed for a direct-to-digital premiere through the streaming service Amazon Prime Video. The film released on 16 October 2021, during the Dusshera weekend and eventually received widespread critical acclaim, with praise directed on Kaushal's performance, direction, screenplay and technical aspects. The film was also noted for its realistic portrayal of the Jallianwala Bagh massacre, being depicted in an extended and graphic sequence. Sardar Udham was listed by several publications as one of the best Hindi films of 2021, while Forbes named it 2021’s Best Hindi film with a social message.

Sardar Udham won 9 Filmfare Awards from 14 nominations, including Best Film (Critics) and Best Actor (Critics) (for Kaushal), thus becoming the most-awarded film at the ceremony.

Plot 
The film follows a non-linear narrative, going back and forth from the present, where Sardar Udham Singh is in London, to his past when he was part of the Hindustan Socialist Republican Association (HSRA) and explores his reasons for assassinating Indian Civil Service officer Michael O'Dwyer. Udham (known as Sher Singh) is released from prison at Punjab in British India. He is constantly being watched by the colonial authorities. He leaves India and goes to USSR during what appears to be winter. From there he makes his way to London by ship. Even though the British authorities are on the lookout for him, he successfully evades them and lives in London, making a living as a salesman and then a welder. He is shown in front of Caxton Hall, making his way inside where O'Dwyer is giving a speech on his time as Lt. Governor of Punjab and how he had suppressed a major uprising. Udham makes his way to O'Dwyer and shoots him, and is arrested.

Udham is appointed a lawyer who slowly gets Udham to tell his backstory. Udham is brought to court and in spite of a good lawyer, the judges sentence him to death. Upon hearing this, Udham makes an impromptu speech where he denounces British rule in India and reaffirms his support for the Indian freedom movement. Udham protests the conditions of his detention and goes on a 42-day fast, but is force-fed to break it. He slowly opens up to the investigating inspector and tells him the reasons for the assassination. Udham also got the title of Shaheed-E-Azam.

In 1919, Udham is a young adult working in a textile mill near Amritsar, with a girlfriend who is mute. On 13 April 1919, General Dyer on order from O'Dwyer opens fire on a crowd of 20,000 peaceful protestors inside Jallianwala Bagh. Udham is sleeping unaware of the massacre, until his friend wakes him up, mortally wounded and bleeding profusely. He hears about the massacre and rushes to the grounds to help. It is shown that along with a few other volunteers, Udham finds survivors and gets them to a makeshift hospital which is overwhelmed itself. He is later executed and shown to have a photo of Bhagat Singh, taken when Bhagat was in prison during his final days.

After the Independence of India, Udham's ashes are brought to India upon the request of Punjab Chief Minister Giani Zail Singh and were immersed in Sutlej river. His ashes were immersed where his idol Bhagat's ashes were immersed. In the final scene, Gen. Dyer and O'Dwyer give their own accounts to the Hunter Commission.

Cast 

 Vicky Kaushal as Sher "Udham" Singh aka Ram Mohammad Singh Azad
 Shaun Scott as Michael O'Dwyer
 Stephen Hogan as Detective Inspector Swain
 Amol Parashar as Bhagat Singh
 Banita Sandhu as Reshma
 Kirsty Averton as Eileen Palmer
 Andrew Havill as General Reginald Dyer
 Ritesh Shah as Koppikar
 Manas Tiwari as Nihal Singh
 Tim Berrington as John Hutchinson
 Tim Hudson as Winston Churchill
 Nicholas Gecks as Justice Atkinson
 Sam Retford as Detective Deighton
 Simon Weir as King George VI
 Jogi Mallang as Surat Ali
 Kuljeet Singh as S. S. Johal
 Abhishek Malik as Bhagat Singh's associate
 Tushar Singhal as Udham's informer
 Sarfaraz Alam Safu as Interpreter At Scotland Yard

Production

Development 
A film based on the life of the Indian revolutionary Udham Singh was announced in March 2019, with Shoojit Sircar directing the film and has Vicky Kaushal playing the lead character. Shoojit decided to cast Kaushal in the lead, because he wanted an "actor who is ready to give his heart and soul to the film" and the latter, hailing from Punjab, similar to Udham Singh, also a native of Punjab. Kaushal stated it as his dream project as he admired of Shoojit's filmography, further saying "The way he is looking at the character (Udham Singh) and the world is extraordinary as well as beautiful. Plus, it's also a big honour for me that finally, I am going to be directed by him. Honestly, that's something that will take time to sink in". The film marked the second Indian project to be based on the life of the Indian revolutionary after the Raj Babbar-starrer Shaheed Udham Singh (2000).

The film's storyline traces from Singh's age of 20 to 40, showcasing the events of Jallianwala Bagh massacre, to the assassination of Michael O'Dwyer, the Governor of Punjab (India) who was responsible for the incident. The idea was initially pitched to be presented in mid-1990s, after Shoojit read about the events and life of Udham Singh, when he was a student at the Shaheed Bhagat Singh College in Delhi, but had waited for two decades due to his extensive research about Udham Singh, with Shoojit wanting to showcase Udham's life to the current generation of younger audiences. Initially, the role was offered to Irrfan Khan, and his son Babil Khan was reported to play the younger version of Udham Singh. However, due to the former's health issues, he stepped out doing the role and insisted Kaushal to play the lead. Kaushal had undergone physical transformation to represent the younger version of Singh, losing 15 kilograms within two months. He also appeared in a rugged look for few sequences, and shared the stills of his transformation in his social media accounts, closer to the film's release, which was praised by fans and celebrities alike.

In November 2019, Banita Sandhu who worked with Shoojit in October (2018) confirmed her presence, saying that she will play an important role in the film. Television and theatre actor Amol Parashar was assigned to play the role of Indian freedom fighter Bhagat Singh. Amol told in an interview with The Indian Express, saying "I didn’t have to copy any other actor’s interpretation because nobody knows how tall he was, how he walked. It’s only through the written accounts, which mostly are about his ideas and thought process. Now we needed to create a person who’s believable. It was more about his energy." The film also has British actors Shaun Scott, Kirsty Averton and Stephen Hogan playing prominent roles. Originally titled Sardar Udham Singh, the title was later changed to Sardar Udham.

Filming 
On the centennial year of Jallianwala Bagh massacre on 13 April 2019, the makers started the principal photography began in London, with a 25–day schedule being filmed and the team moved to Russia in late-April, while also filming for several sequences in St. Petersburg. Since the film is set in the pre-Independence era, Shoojit wanted to recreate the settings, characters and things related to that period. Since, being his first period film, he felt difficult to research about the things used, as "there are few records available and those there are were speculative". He gained ideas on recreating that period by watching American and European cinema, documentaries and collected archived pictures from online medium. Four days before the shooting of the film kickstarted, Kaushal faced injuries while shooting for another film and had 13 stitches on his cheek. But Shoojit advised him to come with the shoot saying that Sardar Udham will also have stitches, and shot for his portions with a real scar in his face.

The film makers shot a month-long schedule in Russia and the team headed to Ireland and Germany during mid-June 2019. With a three-month shooting in parts of Europe and other countries, the team returned to India to commence the second schedule in Amritsar, Punjab in October 2019. The schedule went on for 25 days where sequences featuring the massacre and its aftermath being shot. Vicky Kaushal stated in an interview on the recreation of the incident as "it was  physically exhausting, heart-wrenching and emotionally numbing as an individual, but as an actor, we have to be prepared at all sorts. To be thrown into that reality, almost a reality, to imagine yourself in that space. I had to react to dead bodies and all that bloodshed and bloodbath." Since, the crew were not allowed to shoot the incidents at Jallianwala Bagh, the makers recreated few portions in the empty sets in Punjab. Some scenes were also shot at Hoshiarpur. The team returned to Europe for shooting few sequences in November. The makers wrapped up the shooting of the film on 27 December 2019, after consecutively filming for 6–7 months and spanning four seasons. The portions involved in London, were recreated in Russia, excepts for few sequences which were shot in United Kingdom and Ireland.

Post-production 
The film's post-production works were scheduled to begin during mid-March 2020, but however was delayed indefinitely due to the COVID-19 pandemic lockdown in India. On 8 June 2020, the makers decided to begin post-production activities for the film with Shoojit activating a four-phase plan starting with editing process, which go on for 15–20 days. Chandrashkehar Prajapati was the editor of the film, and during the editing process, only the director, editor and his assistants, were allowed inside the editing room, working while strictly adhering to social distancing protocols and had to complete all editing works before the night curfew at 7:00 p.m. He also felt grateful that the film industry has developed an app that allows them to share edited content, frame by frame, with explanatory comments, back and forth through online. Shoojit wanted to resume visual effects in the second phase of post-production, but was pushed further, as it needed a larger number of crew of about 150–200 people.

Composer Shantanu Moitra worked on the film's score during June 2020. After few relaxations announced during mid-September 2020, the makers resumed work on visual effects. Later, work on the sound design was resumed in October, as the last phase in the post-production process. A part of the sound design was happened in Europe and another part took place in-house in Kolkata. Other activities such as digital intermediate, color grading and pre-visualization eventually, began during early-2021. As per the suggestion of cinematographer Avik Mukhopadhyay, and other crew members — executive producer Kumar Thakur, art directors Mansi Mehta and Dmitriy Malich — the makers focused on the use of colour palettes with a gray-colored theme during the foreign sequences, and a sepia colored theme for the sequences in Amritsar. Vicky Kaushal completed dubbing for his portions within September 2021.

Soundtrack 

The soundtrack to Sardar Udham featured six instrumental compositions used in the film score curated and composed by Shantanu Moitra. Though the film does not feature any songs, Moitra composed the film score during the COVID-19 pandemic lockdown period in June 2020. Before the start of the shoot, he recorded one instrumental track by considering the state of Udham Singh's mind in that music piece. The work on the film's musical score began during the pre-production phase, where he and his musical team planned and designed the film score in his home space.  The tunes were produced by George Joseph, each tracks were curated carefully based on the life and events revolving around Udham Singh. On 2 October 2021, the entire album consisting of instrumental tracks were released by Zee Music Company. The lead actor, Vicky Kaushal, who shared the entire music album through social media and music platforms called it as the "soul of the film".

In the film's review published in the magazine The Week, Aiswarya Venugopal stated about the music, saying "the six instrumental tracks composed by Shantanu Moitra, flows perfectly as it depicts different phases of Udham's life". Umesh Punwani of Koimoi stated that the "background score shines in the second half". A reviewer from Deccan Herald too praised the exclusion of songs in the film as it caters "realistic storytelling". Apart from Moitra's work in the score, the sound design performed by Dipankar "Jojo" Chaki was highly praised for reflecting the authenticity of the pre-Independence era. However, video creator Anmol Jamwal, shared his opinions on the film, praised Moitra's score as it infused with the visuals in the right manner, but, he felt that a composition of a poetry had "enhanced the quality of the film, in few disturbing scenes about the incident being showcased".

Release 
In June 2019, Shoojit Sircar announced that the film would be released theatrically on the occasion of Gandhi Jayanti (2 October 2020), while also rumoured to be clashing with Satyameva Jayate 2 and Jayeshbhai Jordaar. However, in March 2020, the film was later scheduled for release on 30 December 2020, which was also postponed, since the post-production works were affected due to the COVID-19 pandemic lockdown in India. Despite the delays, Shoojit decided to release the film in theatres unlike other major Hindi films, which debuted on digital streaming platforms ever since the closure of theatres across the country due to the pandemic.

In September 2021, the producers headed for a direct-to-digital release, considering that theatres were reopened but only in limited states, and also the government did not allow permission to resume operations of theatres in Maharashtra until 22 October 2021. The producers later sold the distribution rights of the film to Amazon Prime Video, which scheduled for a release date of 16 October 2021, coinciding with Dusshera weekend. On 27 September 2021, the makers released the teaser of the film, which introduced its theme and premise in a unique way. Three days later, on 30 September, the official trailer of the film was launched at an event in Mumbai, with the presence of Vicky Kaushal and Shoojit Sircar, along with the film's crew. The trailer received positive response from fans.

Kaushal shared his working stills of the film prior to the release, and also shared facts about Udham Singh, in his Instagram account. On 15 October 2021, a day prior to the release, a special screening of Sardar Udham was conducted to the press, critics and celebrities at a theatre in Mumbai. On the night of the same day, Amazon Prime Video released the film earlier ahead of the scheduled release of 16 October, in more than 240 countries and also in Hindi, Punjabi and English languages.

Reception 

The film received widespread critical acclaim, praising the performances of Kaushal and the supporting cast, realistic portrayal of the Jallianwala Bagh massacre, the setting of the pre-independent India, technical aspects, script and direction.

Shubhra Gupta of The Indian Express gave a positive review stating it as "a long, unhurried re-creation of a turbulent slice of India’s colonial past, going back and forth from Punjab to London, with a few detours here and there". Anna M. M. Vetticad of Firstpost also gave a positive review stating "Shoojit Sircar has chosen to recount a remarkable (and painful) true story with a reliance on facts and facts alone", and further stated "The atrocities committed by the British colonisers in India are epitomised by the cruelty of Jallianwala Bagh. It is nothing short of a feat that Sircar has managed to chronicle that tragedy and its aftermath without turning his film into a call for vendetta. Both in terms of artistic merit and the political statements it makes, Sardar Udham is a landmark for Indian cinema."

Namrata Joshi of National Herald India wrote "Shoojit Sircar’s biopic of the patriot is a stunning slice of history mirroring our fractious present and cautioning us about the pitfalls of the future". Saibal Chatterjee of NDTV stated "The brilliantly lensed biopic also draws power from lead actor Vicky Kaushal's intense and intuitive performance. Sircar combines a portrait of shocking brutality with a depiction of one man's determination not to back off from his risky stratagem. There is a phenomenal degree of craft in Sardar Udham but none of it is employed for mere effect. There is great deal of soul, too, in this magnificently crafted film." Renuka Vyahare of The Times of India stated "This film is a ticking time bomb waiting to explode but beware; the wait tries your patience. The intention is to give a lull before the storm treatment to storytelling. The non-linear, non-verbose narrative struggles to hold your attention even an hour into the movie. The re-enactment of the Jallianwala Bagh massacre is unsettling to watch and that is the very reason why this story needed to be told." Writing for The Week magazine, Aishwarya Venugopal stated "For the biopic of a revolutionary, the film does not throw punch dialogoues or the over-used trope of jingoism. Instead, Sircar takes the viewer smoothly, yet painfully, through his turbulent life". Anuj Kumar of The Hindu stated "Shoojit Sircar explores contentious definitions and concerns, as India continues to grapple with the idea of dissent, and Section 144 remains a repressive tool in the hands of the government of the day".

Soumya Srivatsava of Hindustan Times wrote "Sardar Udham, if there was ever any doubt, also proves once again that Shoojit Sircar is in top form and among the most dependable filmmakers in Hindi cinema right now. From slices of lives to biographies on historical heroes, he has been able to give his distinct stamp to any idea he has picked up. Hope the streak continues another 20 years." Nandini Ramanath of Scroll.in stated "Sardar Udham follows a handful of biopics about a historical figure whose colourful life readily lends itself to fictionalisation. The creators, bravely but also puzzlingly resist the temptation to include what might have been a shoo-in. The non-linear screenplay by Shubendu Bhattacharya (who also has a story credit) and Ritesh Shah is based on facts but takes creative licence with them." On the other hand, Syed Firdaus Ashraf of Rediff gave a mixed review saying "You neither get goosebumps nor the adrenaline rush of desh bhakti (patriotism), which a film like Sardar Udham should give every Indian. But a story of an unsung hero is needed to be told and hats off to Shoojit Sircar for doing that."

Several publications listed Sardar Udham as one of the best Bollywood films of 2021, which includes: The Indian Express (Shubhra Gupta and Minnasa Shekhar), Film Companion (Anupama Chopra), Hindustan Times (Devarsi Ghosh), The Hindu (Anuj Kumar), India Today (Anandita Mukherjee) and Firstpost (Subhash K. Jha).

Awards and nominations

Controversies

Copyright issues 
A biopic was made on the revolutionary Udham Singh, as Shaheed Udham Singh (2000) before Sardar Udham was conceptualised. The film's producer Iqbal Dhillon sent a public notice to Kaushal and Sircar claiming over the copyright of the film's biopic. The notice had stated "We, Surjit Movies and Iqbal Singh Dhillon are the producers and the sole, exclusive and absolute owners of copyrights and all other rights and to all the works of the Punjabi and Hindustani film Shaheed Udham Singh: Alias Ram Mohammed Singh Azad." In defence, few sources had stated that team did not borrow anything from that film and further added that by 2000, all his life’s work is copyright free and the team will not have any trouble for the film, unless the family of Udham Singh have any issue with the content.

Academy Award submission 
The film was shortlisted among 14 other Indian films to be submitted at the 94th Academy Awards under the nomination of Best Foreign Film category. However, it was not selected. The jury members — Bengali music composer-director Indraadip Dasgupta and production designer Sumit Basu — criticised the length of the film and its delayed climax, which was the reason for not being selected to the nominations. The latter, however, stated that the film projects "hatred towards the British". The decision from the jury members received some backlash, calling their reasons "baseless". However, the director Shoojit Sircar and Vicky Kaushal respected the jury's decision as "a personal and subjective opinion". They however supported the Tamil film Koozhangal, which was selected as the official entry to the award ceremony, but that was also not nominated.

Controversy Surrounds Rejection of 'Sardar Udham' as India's Official Oscar Entry: A Debate on Remembering the Past and Presenting India to the World.

References

External links 
 

 

2020s historical drama films
2021 biographical drama films
2021 direct-to-video films
2021 films
Amazon Prime Video original films
Cultural depictions of Bhagat Singh
Cultural depictions of George VI
Cultural depictions of Winston Churchill
Film productions suspended due to the COVID-19 pandemic
Films about revolutionaries
Films directed by Shoojit Sircar
Films not released in theaters due to the COVID-19 pandemic
Films postponed due to the COVID-19 pandemic
Films scored by Shantanu Moitra
Films set in 1919
Films set in 1933
Films set in 1934
Films set in 1939
Films set in 1940
Films set in London
Films set in Punjab, India
Films set in the British Raj
Films set in the Indian independence movement
Films shot in Ireland
Films shot in London
Films shot in Punjab, India
Films shot in Russia
2020s Hindi-language films
Indian biographical drama films
Indian direct-to-video films
Indian historical drama films
Indian nonlinear narrative films
Indian historical action films